Chrysanthrax vanus is a species of bee fly in the family Bombyliidae.

Distribution
Canada, United States.

References

Bombyliidae
Insects described in 1897
Taxa named by Daniel William Coquillett
Diptera of North America